Tosapusia evelyniana is a species of sea snail, a marine gastropod mollusk, in the family Costellariidae, the ribbed miters.

Description
The holotype of the species (MNHN IM-2000-20641), measured .

Distribution
This marine species occurs off Madagascar and the Philippines ( Bohol, off Balicasag Island)

References

 Huang S.I [Shih-I]. (2017). Nine new species and one new name of the family Costellariidae from Taiwan, Japan and the Philippines (Gastropoda: Neogastropoda: Muricoidea). Visaya. 4(6): 49-70.
 Guillot de Suduiraut E. (2007) Description of three new species of Costellariidae from the Indian Ocean and the Pacific. Visaya 2(2): 96-100

Costellariidae
Gastropods described in 2017